George Gardiner (27 November 1914 – 17 October 1989) was an Australian cricketer. He played six first-class matches for Western Australia between 1934/35 and 1937/38.

References

External links
 

1914 births
1989 deaths
Australian cricketers
Western Australia cricketers
Cricketers from Perth, Western Australia